The 2016 AFC Futsal Championship was the 14th edition of the AFC Futsal Championship, the biennial international futsal championship organised by the Asian Football Confederation (AFC) for the men's national teams of Asia. The tournament was held in Uzbekistan between 10–21 February 2016. A total of 16 teams played in the tournament.

The tournament was originally meant to be held in Taiwan (i.e. the Republic of China). It was originally scheduled for 12–27 March 2016, but this was changed following the adoption of the FIFA futsal international match calendar.

Same as previous editions held on the same year as the FIFA Futsal World Cup, the tournament acted as the AFC qualifiers for the World Cup. The top five teams of the tournament qualified for the 2016 FIFA Futsal World Cup in Colombia as the AFC representatives.

Champions Iran, runners-up Uzbekistan, third-placed Thailand, fourth-placed Vietnam and fifth place's play-off winners Australia qualified for the 2016 FIFA Futsal World Cup as the AFC representatives.

Qualification

The draw for the qualifiers was held on 2 September 2015. Four teams qualified directly for the final tournament by their 2014 performance, while the other entrants competed in the qualifying stage for the remaining 12 spots. The qualifiers were played between 1 October and 19 November 2015.

Qualified teams
The following 16 teams qualified for the final tournament. Kuwait were replaced by Saudi Arabia due to FIFA's suspension of the Kuwait Football Association.

Venues

Squads

Each team had to submit a squad of 14 players, including a minimum of two goalkeepers.

Draw
The draw for the final tournament was held on 2 December 2015, 18:00 UZT (UTC+5), at the Zafarshan Hall in Tashkent. The 16 teams were drawn into four groups of four teams. The teams were seeded according to their performance in the previous season in 2014.

Match officials
The following referees were chosen for the 2016 AFC Futsal Championship.

Referees

  Chris Colley
  An Ran
  Liu Jianqiao
  Lee Po-fu
  Vahid Arzpeyma Mohammreh
  Hasan Mousa Al-Gburi
  Hawkar Salar Ahmed
  Tomohiro Kozaki
  Hiroyuki Kobayashi
  Husein Mahmoud Khalaileh
  Nurdin Bukuev
  Helday Idang
  Rey Ritaga Martinez
  Yuttakon Maiket
  Khamis Hassan Al Shamsi
  Trương Quốc Dũng

Group stage
The top two teams of each group advanced to the quarter-finals.

Tiebreakers
The teams were ranked according to points (3 points for a win, 1 point for a draw, 0 points for a loss). If tied on points, tiebreakers would be applied in the following order:
Greater number of points obtained in the group matches between the teams concerned;
Goal difference resulting from the group matches between the teams concerned;
Greater number of goals scored in the group matches between the teams concerned;
If, after applying criteria 1 to 3, teams still have an equal ranking, criteria 1 to 3 are reapplied exclusively to the matches between the teams in question to determine their final rankings. If this procedure does not lead to a decision, criteria 5 to 9 apply;
Goal difference in all the group matches;
Greater number of goals scored in all the group matches;
Penalty shoot-out if only two teams are involved and they are both on the field of play;
Fewer score calculated according to the number of yellow and red cards received in the group matches (1 point for a single yellow card, 3 points for a red card as a consequence of two yellow cards, 3 points for a direct red card, 4 points for a yellow card followed by a direct red card);
Drawing of lots.

All times were local, UZT (UTC+5).

Group A

Group B

Group C

Group D

Knockout stage
In the knockout stage, extra time and penalty shoot-out would be used to decide the winner if necessary (no extra time would be used in the third place match).

Bracket

Quarter-finals
Winners qualified for 2016 FIFA Futsal World Cup. Losers enter fifth place play-offs.

Fifth place play-offs

Fifth place match
Australia qualified for 2016 FIFA Futsal World Cup.

Semi-finals

Third place match

Final

Goalscorers

Awards
Most Valuable Player:  Ali Asghar Hassanzadeh
Top Scorer:  Suphawut Thueanklang

Final ranking

Qualified teams for FIFA Futsal World Cup
The following five teams from AFC qualified for the 2016 FIFA Futsal World Cup

1 Bold indicates champion for that year. Italic indicates host for that year.
2 Australia qualified as a member of the OFC between 1989 and 2004.

Broadcasting

References

External links
AFC Futsal Championship, the-AFC.com

 
2016
2016 FIFA Futsal World Cup qualification
2016 in Asian futsal
International futsal competitions hosted by Uzbekistan
2016 in Uzbekistani football